John Henry Bell (29 August 1919 – 1994) was an English footballer who played as a full-back.

Bell played league football for Gateshead between 1946 and 1950, playing a total of 57 league games in the Football League Third Division North & FA Cup without scoring.

Career statistics

Sources

1919 births
1994 deaths
English footballers
Association football defenders
Gateshead F.C. players
English Football League players